The 2009 Churchill Cup took place between June 6 and June 21, 2009, marking the seventh year of the Churchill Cup.

For the first time in the tournament's history, all rounds were held in the United States. This was done in an effort to reduce the cost of the tournament after the discontinued sponsorship by Barclays and to keep the tournament from being suspended for a year. Tickets for the event went on sale to USA Rugby members on April 2, 2009, and general sales tickets went on sale on April 24, 2009. The matches were broadcast live on Sky Sports in the UK and Setanta Sports North America in the US.

Winners

Format
The teams played in a round-robin format between two pools to decide the elimination matches which took place on June 20, 2009. All six teams participated on the finals day: the two pool winners competed in the Cup Final, the two runners-up played in a Plate Final, and the two bottom-placed teams met in the Bowl Final.

Venues
After the 2008 tournament, which was played both in Canada and the United States, in 2009 all rounds of the tournament as well as the Finals Day were played around the Denver, Colorado area which is the future home for the tournament for the next three years. The first three days of round-robin play were at the modern, purpose-built rugby stadium Infinity Park in Glendale, Colorado on the south side of Denver. The finals were held at Dick's Sporting Goods Park in Commerce City, which is home to Denver's MLS team, the Colorado Rapids.

Tables

Pool A

Pool B

Results

Day 1

Day 2

Day 3

Finals

Bowl Final

Plate Final

Cup Final

References

External links
Churchill Cup Official Site
2009 Tournament Details

2009
2009 rugby union tournaments for national teams
Sports competitions in Denver
International rugby union competitions hosted by the United States
2008–09 in Irish rugby union
2008–09 in English rugby union
2009 in Canadian rugby union
2009 in Argentine rugby union
2009 in American rugby union
June 2009 sports events in the United States
2009 in sports in Colorado
2000s in Denver
2009 in Georgian sport